Moala may refer to:

 Moala (beetle), a genus of beetles in the family Cerambycidae
 Moala Airport, an airport serving Moala, the main island of the Moala Islands
 Moala Island, a volcanic island in the Moala subgroup
 Moala Islands, a subgroup of Fiji's Lau archipelago

People with the surname
 Indira Moala, a participant in New Zealand Idol
 Fili Moala (born 1985), American football player

See also
 

Surnames of Tongan origin
Tongan-language surnames